Hunted is an Australian reality television series based on the British reality television series of the same name. The first season premiered on 17 July 2022 on Network 10.

Premise
The show is a competition series that centres on nine teams of two as they are "fugitives" on the run from highly skilled hunters. Fugitives are released from a common location at the start of the hunt, with an overnight bag and $500 ($200 cash and $300 on a debit card). Each pair attempts to use their wits to evade capture for 21 days in the state of Victoria.

Meanwhile, a team of hunters attempt to locate and capture the fugitives using replicated "powers of the state" such as ANPR and CCTV. The hunters are also given access to the fugitive's bank accounts and phone records. 24 hours before the end of the hunt, the remaining fugitives call a given phone number to access information about the "extraction point", a location they must reach by the end of the hunt. While the hunters are not informed of the extraction point, fugitive's current locations are disclosed to the hunters once they call the phone number. Any fugitives able to evade capture and make it to the extraction point in time win a share of the grand prize of $100,000.

Hunters

Headquarters
 Dr David Craig - Chief
 Ben Owen - Deputy, Intelligence (Former Chief Hunter on Hunted UK and former Hunter on Hunted USA)
 Reece Dewar OAM - Deputy, Operations
 Jason Edelstein - Lead, Cyber
 Dr Karla Lopez - Forensic Psychologist
 Graeme Simpfendorfer - Lead Intelligence
 Kerri Collins - Lead Intelligence Analyst
 Vikki Grouios - Ethical Hacker
 Carter Smith - Open Source Intelligence
 Steph Jensen - Open Source Intelligence
 Jay Banerji - Digital Forensics
 Tamara Ruggeiro - Intelligence Officer

Ground Hunters
 Jason Spivey
 Michelle Corlett
 Luke Andrews
 Marco O’Hehir
 Clancy Roberts
 Howie Dawson
 Kellie Andrews
 Rhonda Murray
 Jeremy Hargreaves
 Kim Culpin

Contestants

Season 1
Fugitives began the hunt at Federation Square in Melbourne. The Inverloch Coastal Reserve in Inverloch served as the extraction point.

Episodes

Season 1

Ratings

Season 1

References

External links

Network 10 original programming
2022 Australian television series debuts
2020s Australian reality television series
Australian television series based on British television series
English-language television shows
Television shows set in Victoria (Australia)
Television shows filmed in Australia
Television series by Endemol Australia
Television series by Banijay